Phepsalostoma is a genus of moths in the family Cosmopterigidae. It contains only one species, Phepsalostoma electracma, which is found on Java.

References

External links
Natural History Museum Lepidoptera genus database

Cosmopterigidae